The 2020 Go Bowling 235 was a NASCAR Cup Series raced on August 16, 2020, at Daytona International Speedway in Daytona Beach, Florida. Contested over 65 laps on the  road course, it was the 23rd race of the 2020 NASCAR Cup Series season, which was a replacement race for the Watkins Glen round because of government restrictions due to the COVID-19 pandemic.

The race had three stages: the first two stages at 15 laps each, and 35 for the final.

On July 30, it was revealed after simulation testing revealed concerns of high speeds entering turn 1 (a turn already considered to be difficult among road racers), a temporary chicane was added in between the 4th turn of the oval and the entrance to pit road (similar to the Charlotte ROVAL). NASCAR further announced that it would use the high-downforce aero package used for the road course races in 2019 (in 2020, road courses were scheduled to use a low-downforce package similar to what was used in 2018 and what is used on ovals 1-mile or shorter in 2020). The addition of the chicane increased the length of the course from 3.56 to 3.61 miles and added a 13th and 14th turn to the original 12-turn layout.

Entry list
 (R) denotes rookie driver.
 (i) denotes driver who are ineligible for series driver points.

Qualifying
Kevin Harvick was awarded the pole for the race as determined by a new formula that NASCAR officials announced on August 6. The formula will use three performance metrics, which will be weighted and averaged to determine the lineup and pit selection order. The metrics are Finishing position from the previous race (weighted 50%), Ranking in team owner points standings (35%), and Fastest lap from the previous race (15%).  The success of this system led to NASCAR replacing the traditional rules for determining starting positions of owner points, then race winners, and then most qualifying attempts (with owner points as the tiebreaker) in the 2021 season if qualifying cannot be held because of inclement weather in the eight races where practice and qualifying cannot be conducted, and expanded in the 2022 season to determining practice and qualifying groups for all races.

Kaz Grala replaced Austin Dillon, who was medically disqualified by NASCAR after a positive virus test. NASCAR further restricted drivers from participation in more than one race during the weekend, which meant typical Xfinity drivers who would substitute would not be permitted to participate in the Cup race. NASCAR did allow an Xfinity Series driver who was still on premises to relieve for a Cup driver in Sunday's event who fell ill.

Starting Lineup

Race

Stage Results

Stage One
Laps: 15

Stage Two
Laps: 15

Final Stage Results

Stage Three
Laps: 35

Notes

Race statistics
 Lead changes: 13 among 6 different drivers
 Cautions/Laps: 4 for 7
 Red flags: 1 for 31 minutes and 14 seconds
 Time of race: 2 hours, 37 minutes and 30 seconds
 Average speed:

Media

Television
NBC Sports covered the race on the television side. Rick Allen, Jeff Burton, Steve Letarte and four-time Daytona winner Dale Earnhardt Jr. covered the race from the booth at Charlotte Motor Speedway. Dave Burns, Parker Kligerman and Dillon Welch handled the pit road duties on site, and Rutledge Wood handled the features from his home during the race.

Radio
MRN had the radio call for the race, which was also simulcast on Sirius XM NASCAR Radio.

Standings after the race

Drivers' Championship standings

Manufacturers' Championship standings

Note: Only the first 16 positions are included for the driver standings.
. – Driver has clinched a position in the NASCAR Cup Series playoffs.

References

NASCAR races at Daytona International Speedway
Go Bowling 235
Go Bowling 235
Go Bowling 235